Thomas R. Mills, billed as Tom Mills, was an actor and director of silent films. He was a theater actor until he joined Vitagraph to make films.

He was born in Headcorn, Kent, England.

Filmography

Actor

 The Making Over of Geoffrey Manning (1915)
 The Man Who Couldn't Beat God (1915)
The Hero of Submarine D-2 (1916)
The Crown Prince's Double (1916)
Whom the Gods Destroy (1916)
 Indiscretion (1917)
A Man's Mate (1924)
The Star Dust Trail (1924)
The Guilty One (1924)
The Arizona Romeo (1924)
The Wolf Man (1924)
The Kiss Barrier (1925)
Tides of Passion (1925)
The Gilded Highway (1926)
The Great Impersonation (1935)
It's Love I'm After (1937)

Director
The Duplicity of Hargraves (1917), film adaptation
A Night in New Arabia (1917)
The Girl in His House (1918)
Thin Ice (1919)
The Unknown Quantity (1919)
Duds (1920)
The Invisible Divorce (1920), co-directed

References

External links

English male silent film actors
English film directors
Year of birth missing
Year of death missing